= Mitare, Venezuela =

Mitare
- Interactive map of Mitare
- Coordinates: 11°21′02″N 070°01′50″W
- Country: Venezuela
- State: Falcón state

Mitare is a community located in northern Falcón state, Venezuela.
